Vincent Dwayne Herring (born November 19, 1964) is an American jazz saxophonist, flautist, composer, and educator. Known for his fiery and soulful playing in the bands of Horace Silver, Freddie Hubbard, and Nat Adderley in the earlier stages of his career, he now frequently performs around the world with his own groups and is heavily involved in jazz education.

Biography
He was born in Hopkinsville, Kentucky, United States. His parents divorced, and he and his mother moved to California. When he was 11, he started playing saxophone in school bands and studying privately at Dean Frederick's School of Music in Vallejo, California. At age 16, he entered California State University, Chico on a music scholarship.

A year later, Herring auditioned for the United States Military Academy band, Jazz Knights, playing lead alto sax. He moved to West Point and served one enlisted tour. In 1982 he moved to New York City attending Long Island University.

Herring first toured the United States and Europe as part of the Lionel Hampton Big Band. His talents came to the attention of Nat Adderley, and the two forged a nine-year musical relationship that led to nine albums and touring around the world year after year. After Adderley's death, Herring collaborated with former Cannonball Adderley bandmember Louis Hayes to form the Cannonball Adderley Legacy Band. He also worked and recorded with pianist Cedar Walton for over two decades. He has also appeared on stage or recordings with Dizzy Gillespie, Horace Silver, Art Blakey and the Jazz Messengers, Jack DeJohnette's Special Edition, Freddie Hubbard, James Carter, Larry Coryell, Steve Turre, the Mingus Big Band, Billy Taylor, Nancy Wilson, Kenny Barron, Roy Hargrove, Arthur Taylor, Carla Bley, Mike LeDonne, Eric Alexander, Wallace Roney, Carl Allen, Bobby Watson, Gary Bartz, Sonny Fortune, Cyrus Chestnut, Jeremy Pelt, Joe Farnsworth, and the Phil Woods Sax Machine (a band augmenting Woods' regular quintet to an octet with three additional alto saxophonists). Herring has appeared as a special guest soloist with Wynton Marsalis at Lincoln Center as well as with Jon Faddis and The Carnegie Hall Big Band.

Herring has recorded over 20 albums as a leader and over 250 as a sideman. In addition to the Cannonball Adderley Legacy Band, Herring's other projects include The Vincent Herring-Joris Dudli's Soul Jazz Alliance, Earth Jazz Agents, Friendly Fire with Vincent Herring and Eric Alexander, and Jazz The Story.

Herring has taken bands to Japan, Europe, and China on several occasions and has appeared in nearly every major jazz festival in the world. He is also involved in jazz education as a professor at William Paterson University and Manhattan School of Music.

Discography

As leader or co-leader
 1986/89: American Experience (MusicMasters)
 1989: Scene One (Evidence)
 1990: Evidence (Landmark)
 1993: Dawnbird (Landmark)
 1993: Secret Love (MusicMasters)
 1994: Folklore: Live at the Village Vanguard (MusicMasters)
 1994: Days of Wine & Roses (MusicMasters)
 1995: Don' Let It Go (MusicMasters)
 1997: Change the World (MusicMasters)
 1999: Jobim for Lovers (MusicMasters)
 2001: Simple Pleasure (HighNote)
 2001: Burn'in The Blues (Consolidated Artists Productions) with Jeff Palmer, John Abercrombie, Bob Leto
 2003: All Too Real (HighNote)
 2004: Mr. Wizard (HighNote)
 2005: The Battle: Live at Smoke (HighNote)
 2006: Ends and Means (HighNote)
 2007: Live at Smoke (SGM)
 2010: Morning Star (Challenge)
 2011: Friendly Fire: Live at Smoke (HighNote)
 2012: In The Spirit of Coltrane and Cannonball (Yanagisawa)
 2013: The Uptown Shuffle (Smoke Sessions)
 2015: Night and Day (Smoke Sessions)
 2017: Hard Times (Smoke Sessions)
 2019: Bird at 100 (Smoke Sessions)
 2021: Preaching to the Choir (Smoke Sessions)

As sideman
 Alto Legacy Alto Summit w/Phil Woods (Fantasy)
 Barney McAll Quintet Exit (BME)
 Benard Purdie's Soul To Jazz 2 (ACT)
 Carl Allen Quintet The Pursuer (Atlantic)
 Carl Allen Quintet w/Nicholas Payton Testimonial (Atlantic)
 Carl Allen Quintet w/Roy Hargrove Piccadilly Square (Alfa)
 Cedar Walton Composer (Astor Place, 1996)
 Cedar Walton One Flight Down (HighNote, 2006)
 Cedar Walton Seasoned Wood (HighNote, 2008)
 Cedar Walton The Bouncer (HighNote, 2011)
 Cedar Walton The Promise Land (HighNote, 2001)
 Cedar Walton Voices Deep Within (HighNote, 2009)
 Don Braden Sextet Art of the Saxophone (BMG)
 Don Braden Sextet (Double-Time, 2000)
 Donald Brown Quintet People Music (Muse)
 Eddie Allen Quintet Another Point of View (Enja)
 Ferit Odman Autumn in New/York (Equinox, 2011)
 Ferit Odman Nommo (Equinox, 2010)
 Freddie Hubbard Octet MMTC: Monk, Miles, Trane & Cannon (Musicmasters)
 Freddie Hubbard Sextet Bolivia (Musicmasters)
 Gloria Lynne No Detour Ahead (Muse)
 Good Fellas (Vol. 1) (Paddle Wheel)
 Good Fellas (Vol. 2) (Paddle Wheel)
 Good Fellas (Vol. 3) (Paddle Wheel)
 Harold Mabern Mabern Plays Mabern (Smoke Sessions)
 Harold Mabern Mabern Plays Coltrane (Smoke Sessions)
 Joe Chambers Quintet Mirrors (Blue Note)
 Johannes Enders Quiet Fire (Enja)
 John Hicks In the Mix (Landmark)
 John Hicks Piece for My Peace (Landmark)
 Johnny King In From the Cold (Criss Cross)
 Kevin Hays Quintet Sweet Ear (SteepleChase)
 Lainie Kazan Body & Soul (Musicmasters)
 Leon Dorsey Quintet The Watcher (Landmark)
 Louis Hayes Dreamin of Cannonball (TCB)
 Louis Smith Sextet Strike Up the Band (SteepleChase)
 Manhattan Projects Dark Side of Dewey (Alfa)
 Manhattan Projects Echoes of Our Heroes (Alfa
 Manhattan Projects We Remember Cannonball (Alfa)
 Marcus Roberts Portraits in Blue (Sony)
 Melvin Rhyne To Cannonball (Paddle Wheel)
 Mingus Big Band Blues & Politics (Dreyfus)
 Mingus Big Band Que Viva Mingus (Dreyfus)
 Mingus Big Band Three of Four Shades of Love (Dreyfus)
 Mingus Big Band Tonight at Noon (Dreyfus)
 Nat Adderley Quintet A Night in Manhattan (Alfa)
 Nat Adderley Quintet Live at Floating Jazz Fest (Chiaroscuro)
 Nat Adderley Quintet Live at Sweet Basil Vol. 1
 Nat Adderley Quintet Live at Sweet Basil Vol. 2
 Nat Adderley Quintet Live at Sweet Basil (Alfa)
 Nat Adderley Quintet We Remember Cannon (In + Out, 1989)
 Nat Adderley Sextet Autumn Leaves (Sweet Basil, 1990 [1991])
 Nat Adderley Sextet Work Song: Live at Sweet Basil (Sweet Basil, 1990 [1993])
 Nat Adderley Quintet Talkin' About You (Landmark, 1990)
 Nat Adderley Quintet The Old Country (Alfa)
 Nat Adderley Quintet Workin (Timeless)
 Ron McClure Quintet Never Forget (SteepleChase)
 Scott Wendholt Quintet Scheme of Things (Criss Cross)
 Steve Turre The Spirits Up Above (HighNote, 2004)
 Tim Hagans & Marcus Printup Hubsongs (Blue Note)
 Yoichi Kobayashi Sukiyaki

References

External links
 

1964 births
African-American jazz musicians
American jazz alto saxophonists
American jazz flautists
American jazz soprano saxophonists
American male saxophonists
Hard bop saxophonists
HighNote Records artists
Landmark Records artists
Living people
American male jazz musicians
Post-bop saxophonists
United States Military Academy people
20th-century American saxophonists
21st-century American saxophonists
United States Army Band musicians
20th-century American male musicians
21st-century American male musicians
Mingus Big Band members
Smoke Sessions Records artists
20th-century African-American musicians
21st-century African-American musicians
20th-century flautists
21st-century flautists